Brigadier General Lun Maung  (? – 2001) was a Burmese military officer who served as the minister of the Prime Minister's Office and later the minister of energy under the State Peace and Development Council (SPDC). He was killed in a helicopter crash in Kayin State in 2001, along with SPDC Secretary 2 Lieutenant General Tin Oo, and other high-ranking military officials.

During the 1988 uprising, when the junta split the government into military regions, Lun Maung was promoted to commander of the Yangon Command. Lun Maung's son Soe Htut is a military general and minister.

References

Burmese military personnel
2001 deaths
Burmese generals